Michel Laurent (born 10 August 1953) is a French former professional road racing cyclist.

Major results

1975
GP de la Liberté Fribourg
1976
Commentry
Paris–Nice
Promotion Pernod
Tour de Corse
Vernon
1977
Le Creusot
Chateau-Chinon
Tour de France:
7th place overall classification
1978
Critérium des As
Fleche Wallonne
Niort
Orchies
Tour de Corse
Waalse Pijl
1979
Vailly-sur-Sauldre
Tour Méditerranéen
GP Lugano
1980
Critérium International
1981
Bain-de-Bretagne
1982
Circuit des genêts verts
Critérium du Dauphiné Libéré
Tour Méditerranéen
Maël-Pestivien
1983
Tour de France:
Winner stage 16
1984
Vailly-sur-Sauldre

External links

Living people
French male cyclists
1953 births
French Tour de France stage winners
Sportspeople from Saône-et-Loire
Cyclists from Bourgogne-Franche-Comté